Logan Mize is a country music artist/songwriter from Clearwater, Kansas signed to Big Yellow Dog Music.

Music career
In April 2010, Mize signed a publishing/record deal with Big Yellow Dog Music and a booking deal with William Morris Endeavor followed in August 2010. Mize has received air play as a "Highway Find" on satellite radio channel The Highway (Sirius XM). Logan has also experienced success as a songwriter, notably when country music singer Bucky Covington recorded his song “Mexicoma” on his album Good Guys, which charted to No. 30 on Billboard Country Albums and No.43 on Billboard Independent Albums. Logan’s TV features include the “Fabric of Life” Cotton commercial alongside Hayden Panettiere and in the CW series, “Hart of Dixie", which featured both Logan and his band.

In 2012, Mize's second album, Nobody in Nashville (released on Big Yellow Dog Music), charted to No. 49 on Billboard Country Albums and No. 15 on Billboard Heatseekers Albums. Mize has opened for multiple headlining acts including Lady Antebellum, The Band Perry, Leann Rimes, Eric Church, Dierks Bentley, Charlie Daniels Band, Blake Shelton (on the Blake Shelton Country Cruise), Stoney LaRue, Hank Williams and a special tribute with Merle Haggard. In the fall of 2013, Logan accompanied Leann Rimes on her UK tour in Glasgow, London, Birmingham, and Manchester.

On July 28, 2017, Mize released another album, Come Back Road. A single from the album "Ain't Always Pretty" was first released in 2016  and received over 20 million streams on Spotify. He released his 2021 concept album Welcome to Prairieville with Blake Chaffin and his wife Jill Martin.

Discography

Studio albums

Extended plays

Singles

Music videos

References 

Year of birth missing (living people)
Living people
American country singer-songwriters
Country musicians from Kansas
People from Sedgwick County, Kansas
Arista Nashville artists
Singer-songwriters from Kansas